William Donaldson Ballard (March 15, 1927 – July 2, 2019) was an American politician in the state of Georgia.

During World War II, Ballard served in the United States Navy as a demolition expert aboard the LST-1076.

Ballard attended the University of Georgia and was an attorney. In 2012, Ballard marked 60 years of active law practice.

Ballard died July 2, 2019.

References

1927 births
2019 deaths
Democratic Party members of the Georgia House of Representatives
Democratic Party Georgia (U.S. state) state senators
University of Georgia School of Law alumni
People from Newton County, Georgia
Military personnel from Georgia (U.S. state)
Georgia (U.S. state) lawyers
20th-century American lawyers
United States Navy sailors
United States Navy personnel of World War II